Bridge is a Maldivian comedy drama web series written and directed by Amjad Ibrahim. It stars Sheela Najeeb, Ahmed Shaz, Ali Shameel and Amira Ismail in main roles. The pilot episode of the series was released on 2 April 2022 and was concluded on 4 June 2022.

Cast and characters

Main
 Sheela Najeeb as Areesha
 Ahmed Shaz as Haidhar
 Ali Shameel as Saleem
 Amira Ismail as Laila

Recurring
 Mariyam Haleem as Abidha; Laila's mother
 Mohamed Anil as Zahir; Laila's father
 Lucian Kyle Bin Mohamed

Guest
 Abdulla Ayaan as Ayaan
 Umar Arafaath
 Aishath Lahfa as Areesha

Episodes

Development
The project was announced by director Amjad Ibrahim on 22 August 2021 as a potential web series or a feature film. Major part of the series was filmed in Hulhumale'. Filming was completed in the first week of September and editing was initiated by Ravee Farooq on 4 September 2021.

Soundtrack

Release and reception
On 8 October 2021, director Amjad Ibrahim announced that the series will be streamed through digital streaming platform Baiskoafu. The first episode of the series was released on 2 April 2022 in Baiskoafu, on the occasion of Ramadan 1443.

References

Serial drama television series
Maldivian television shows
Maldivian web series